The 1990 ATP Athens Open was a men's tennis tournament played on outdoor clay courts in Athens in Greece that was part of the World Series of the 1990 ATP Tour. It was held from 1 October through 7 October 1990. Seventh-seeded Mark Koevermans won the singles title.

Finals

Singles

 Mark Koevermans defeated  Franco Davín 5–7, 6–4, 6–1
 It was Koevermans' only singles title of his career.

Doubles

 Sergio Casal /  Javier Sánchez defeated  Tom Kempers /  Richard Krajicek 6–4, 6–3
 It was Casal's 7th title of the year and the 32nd of his career. It was Sánchez's 4th title of the year and the 10th of his career.

See also
 1990 Athens Trophy – women's tournament

References

External links
 ITF tournament edition details

Athens International Championship
ATP Athens Open
ATP Athens Open
October 1990 sports events in Europe